Henry Lee Jost (December 6, 1873 – July 13, 1950) was a Democratic Mayor of Kansas City, Missouri from 1912–1916 and a U.S. Congressman from March 4, 1923 – March 3, 1925.

Biography
Jost was born on December 6, 1873, in New York City. He stayed at the Five Points Mission for Homeless Children and was sent westward on an orphan train, where he was adopted in Hopkins, Missouri. He would be called the "orphan boy" mayor.

Jost graduated from the Kansas City Law School in 1898 worked for the Jackson County, Missouri prosecuting attorney’s office in 1909. He was backed by Democratic power boss Joe Shannon with the "rabbits" faction.

In addition to his mayoral and Congressional duties he was also a lecturer on criminal law at the Kansas City School of Law.

Notable events during his tenure:
Construction of Union Station
Establishment of the Federal Reserve Bank of Kansas City

Jost retired in Belton, Missouri. He is buried at Mt. Moriah Cemetery in Kansas City.

References

1873 births
1950 deaths
Politicians from New York City
People from Hopkins, Missouri
Mayors of Kansas City, Missouri
People from Belton, Missouri
Democratic Party members of the United States House of Representatives from Missouri
People from Five Points, Manhattan